Bulbophyllum calceolus is a species of orchid in the genus Bulbophyllum. It is found in the montane forests of Borneo and typically has a 2.5–5 cm (1–2 inch) yellow flower, a bulb in the middle, and a creeping rhizome between each petal.

References
 The Bulbophyllum-Checklist
 The Internet Orchid Species Photo Encyclopedia

External links
 

calceolus